Peisley is a surname. Notable people with the surname include:

Frederick Peisley (1904-1975), British film and television actor 
George Peisley, Australian cattle thief confronted at Oatley, New South Wales in 1898
John Peisley (politician) (1805-1871), Australian politician
John Peisley (1835-1862),  member of Australian Gardiner–Hall gang
Mary Peisley (1718-1757), Irish Quaker writer

See also
Paisley (name)
Peasley